Cao Bao may refer to:

 Cao Bao (Shutong) (曹褒; died 102), style name Shutong (叔通), Eastern Han Dynasty scholar. see Book of the Later Han
 Cao Bao (died 196) (曹豹; died 196), vassal serving under the Eastern Han Dynasty warlord Tao Qian, later served Liu Bei and Lü Bu
 Cao Bao (曹褒), Eastern Han Dynasty official, served as Administrator of Yingchuan, grandfather of Cao Ren